The Triassic is a geologic period and system which spans 50.6 million years from the end of the Permian Period 251.902 million years ago (Mya), to the beginning of the Jurassic Period 201.36 Mya. The Triassic is the first and shortest period of the Mesozoic Era. Both the start and end of the period are marked by major extinction events. The Triassic Period is subdivided into three epochs: Early Triassic, Middle Triassic and Late Triassic.

The Triassic began in the wake of the Permian–Triassic extinction event, which left the Earth's biosphere impoverished; it was well into the middle of the Triassic before life recovered its former diversity. Three categories of organisms can be distinguished in the Triassic record: survivors from the extinction event, new groups that flourished briefly, and other new groups that went on to dominate the Mesozoic Era. Reptiles, especially archosaurs, were the chief terrestrial vertebrates during this time. A specialized subgroup of archosaurs, called dinosaurs, first appeared in the Late Triassic but did not become dominant until the succeeding Jurassic Period. Archosaurs that became dominant in this period were primarily pseudosuchians, ancestors of modern crocodilians, while some archosaurs specialized in flight, the first time among vertebrates, becoming the pterosaurs.

Therapsids, the dominant vertebrates of the preceding Permian period, declined throughout the period. The first true mammals, themselves a specialized subgroup of therapsids, also evolved during this period. The vast supercontinent of Pangaea existed until the mid-Triassic, after which it began to gradually rift into two separate landmasses, Laurasia to the north and Gondwana to the south.

The global climate during the Triassic was mostly hot and dry, with deserts spanning much of Pangaea's interior. However, the climate shifted and became more humid as Pangaea began to drift apart. The end of the period was marked by yet another major mass extinction, the Triassic–Jurassic extinction event, that wiped out many groups, including most pseudosuchians, and allowed dinosaurs to assume dominance in the Jurassic.

Etymology
The Triassic was named in 1834 by Friedrich August von Alberti, after a succession of three distinct rock layers (Greek  meaning 'triad') that are widespread in southern Germany: the lower Buntsandstein (colourful sandstone), the middle Muschelkalk (shell-bearing limestone) and the upper Keuper (coloured clay).

Dating and subdivisions
On the geologic time scale, the Triassic is usually divided into Early, Middle, and Late Triassic Epochs, and the corresponding rocks are referred to as Lower, Middle, or Upper Triassic. The faunal stages from the youngest to oldest are:

Paleogeography

During the Triassic, almost all the Earth's land mass was concentrated into a single supercontinent, Pangaea. This supercontinent was more-or-less centered on the equator and extended between the poles, though it did drift northwards as the period progressed. Southern Pangea, also known as Gondwana, was made up by closely-appressed cratons corresponding to modern South America, Africa, Madagascar, India, Antarctica, and Australia. North Pangea, also known as Laurussia or Laurasia, corresponds to modern-day North America and the fragmented predecessors of Eurasia.

The western edge of Pangea lay at the margin of an enormous ocean, Panthalassa (lit. 'entire sea'), which roughly corresponds to the modern Pacific Ocean. Practically all deep-ocean crust present during the Triassic has been recycled through the subduction of oceanic plates, so very little is known about the open ocean from this time period. Most information on Panthalassan geology and marine life is derived from island arcs and rare seafloor sediments accreted onto surrounding land masses, such as present-day Japan and western North America.

The eastern edge of Pangea was encroached upon by a pair of extensive oceanic basins: The Neo-Tethys (or simply Tethys) and Paleo-Tethys Oceans. These extended from China to Iberia, hosting abundant marine life along their shallow tropical peripheries. They were divided from each other by a long string of microcontinents known as the Cimmerian terranes. Cimmerian crust had detached from Gondwana in the early Permian and drifted northwards during the Triassic, enlarging the Neo-Tethys Ocean which formed in their wake. At the same time, they forced the Paleo-Tethys Ocean to shrink as it was being subducted under Asia. By the end of the Triassic, the Paleo-Tethys Ocean occupied a small area and the Cimmerian terranes began to collide with southern Asia. This collision, known as the Cimmerian Orogeny, continued into the Jurassic and Cretaceous to produce a chain of mountain ranges stretching from Turkey to Malaysia.Pangaea was fractured by widespread faulting and rift basins during the Triassic—especially late in that period—but had not yet separated. The first nonmarine sediments in the rift that marks the initial break-up of Pangaea, which separated eastern North America from Morocco, are of Late Triassic age; in the United States, these thick sediments comprise the Newark Supergroup. Rift basins are also common in South America, Europe, and Africa. Terrestrial environments are particularly well-represented in the South Africa, Russia, central Europe, and the southwest United States. Terrestrial Triassic biostratigraphy is mostly based on terrestrial and freshwater tetrapods, as well as conchostracans ("clam shrimps"), a type of fast-breeding crustacean which lived in lakes and hypersaline environments.

Because a supercontinent has less shoreline compared to a series of smaller continents, Triassic marine deposits are relatively uncommon on a global scale. A major exception is in Western Europe, where the Triassic was first studied. The northeastern margin of Gondwana was a stable passive margin along the Neo-Tethys Ocean, and marine sediments have been preserved in parts of northern India and Arabia. In North America, marine deposits are limited to a few exposures in the west.

Scandinavia
During the Triassic peneplains are thought to have formed in what is now Norway and southern Sweden. Remnants of this peneplain can be traced as a tilted summit accordance in the Swedish West Coast. In northern Norway Triassic peneplains may have been buried in sediments to be then re-exposed as coastal plains called strandflats. Dating of illite clay from a strandflat of Bømlo, southern Norway, have shown that landscape there became weathered in Late Triassic times ( 210 million years ago) with the landscape likely also being shaped during that time.

Paleooceanography 
Eustatic sea level in the Triassic was consistently low compared to the other geological periods. Low global sea levels persisted into the earliest Jurassic. The long-term sea level trend is superimposed by 22 sea level drop events widespread in the geologic record, mostly of minor (less than ) and medium magnitudes. A lack of evidence for Triassic continental ice sheets suggest that glacial eustasy is unlikely to be the cause of these changes.

Climate
The Triassic continental interior climate was generally hot and dry, so that typical deposits are red bed sandstones and evaporites. There is no evidence of glaciation at or near either pole; in fact, the polar regions were apparently moist and temperate, providing a climate suitable for forests and vertebrates, including reptiles. Pangaea's large size limited the moderating effect of the global ocean; its continental climate was highly seasonal, with very hot summers and cold winters. The strong contrast between the Pangea supercontinent and the global ocean triggered intense cross-equatorial monsoons, sometimes referred to as megamonsoons.

The Triassic may have mostly been a dry period, but evidence exists that it was punctuated by several episodes of increased rainfall in tropical and subtropical latitudes of the Tethys Sea and its surrounding land. Sediments and fossils suggestive of a more humid climate are known from the Anisian to Ladinian of the Tethysian domain, and from the Carnian and Rhaetian of a larger area that includes also the Boreal domain (e.g., Svalbard Islands), the North American continent, the South China block and Argentina.

The best-studied of such episodes of humid climate, and probably the most intense and widespread, was the Carnian Pluvial Event. A 2020 study found bubbles of carbon dioxide in basaltic rocks dating back to the end of the Triassic, and concluded that volcanic activity helped trigger climate change in that period.

Flora

Land plants 
On land, the surviving vascular plants included the lycophytes, the dominant cycadophytes, ginkgophyta (represented in modern times by Ginkgo biloba), ferns, horsetails and glossopterids. The spermatophytes, or seed plants, came to dominate the terrestrial flora: in the northern hemisphere, conifers, ferns and bennettitales flourished. The seed fern genus Dicroidium would dominate Gondwana throughout the period.

Coal 

No known coal deposits date from the start of the Triassic Period. This is known as the Early Triassic "coal gap" and can be seen as part of the Permian–Triassic extinction event. Possible explanations for the coal gap include sharp drops in sea level at the time of the Permo-Triassic boundary; acid rain from the Siberian Traps eruptions or from an impact event that overwhelmed acidic swamps; climate shift to a greenhouse climate that was too hot and dry for peat accumulation; evolution of fungi or herbivores that were more destructive of wetlands; the extinction of all plants adapted to peat swamps, with a hiatus of several million years before new plant species evolved that were adapted to peat swamps; or soil anoxia as oxygen levels plummeted.

Phytoplankton 
Before the Permian extinction, Archaeplastida (red and green algae) had been the major marine phytoplanktons since about 659–645 million years ago, when they replaced marine planktonic cyanobacteria, which first appeared about 800 million years ago, as the dominant phytoplankton in the oceans. In the Triassic, secondary endosymbiotic algae became the most important plankton.

Fauna

Marine invertebrates 
In marine environments, new modern types of corals appeared in the Early Triassic, forming small patches of reefs of modest extent compared to the great reef systems of Devonian or modern times. Serpulids appeared in the Middle Triassic. Microconchids were abundant. The shelled cephalopods called ammonites recovered, diversifying from a single line that survived the Permian extinction.

Fish 
The fish fauna was remarkably uniform, with many families and genera exhibiting a global distribution in the wake of the Permian-Triassic mass extinction event. Ray-finned fishes (actinopterygians) went through a remarkable diversification during the Triassic, leading to peak diversity during the Middle Triassic; however, the pattern of this diversification is still not well understood due to a taphonomic megabias. Large predatory actinopterygians such as saurichthyids and birgeriids appeared in the Early Triassic and became widespread and successful during the period as a whole. Lakes and rivers were populated by lungfish (Dipnoi), such as Ceratodus, which are mainly known from the dental plates, abundant in the fossils record. Hybodonts, a group of shark-like cartilaginous fish, were dominant in both freshwater and marine environments throughout the Triassic.

Amphibians 
Temnospondyl amphibians were among those groups that survived the Permian–Triassic extinction. Once abundant in both terrestrial and aquatic environments, the terrestrial species had mostly died out during the extinction event. The Triassic survivors were aquatic or semi-aquatic, and were represented by Tupilakosaurus, Thabanchuia, Branchiosauridae and Micropholis, all of which died out in Early Triassic, and the successful Stereospondyli, with survivors into the Cretaceous Period. Some lineages (e.g. trematosaurs) flourished briefly in the Early Triassic, while others (e.g. capitosaurs) remained successful throughout the whole period, or only came to prominence in the Late Triassic (e.g. Plagiosaurus, metoposaurs).

The first Lissamphibians (modern amphibians) appear in the Triassic, with the progenitors of the first frogs already present by the Early Triassic. However, the group as a whole did not become common until the Jurassic, when the temnospondyls had become very rare.

Most of the Reptiliomorpha, stem-amniotes that gave rise to the amniotes, disappeared in the Triassic, but two water-dwelling groups survived: Embolomeri that only survived into the early part of the period, and the Chroniosuchia, which survived until the end of the Triassic.

Reptiles

Archosauromorphs 
The Permian–Triassic extinction devastated terrestrial life. Biodiversity rebounded as the surviving species repopulated empty terrain, but these were short-lived. Diverse communities with complex food-web structures took 30 million years to reestablish. Archosauromorph reptiles, which had already appeared and diversified to an extent in the Permian Period, exploding in diversity as an adaptive radiation in response to the Permian-Triassic mass extinction. By the Early Triassic, several major archosauromorph groups had appeared. Long-necked, lizard-like early archosauromorphs were known as protorosaurs, which is likely a paraphyletic group rather than a true clade. Tanystropheids were a family of protorosaurs which elevated their neck size to extremes, with the largest genus Tanystropheus having a neck longer than its body. The protorosaur family Sharovipterygidae used their elongated hindlimbs for gliding. Other archosauromorphs, such as rhynchosaurs and allokotosaurs, were mostly stocky-bodied herbivores with specialized jaw structures.

Rhynchosaurs, barrel-gutted herbivores, thrived for only a short period of time, becoming extinct about 220 million years ago. They were exceptionally abundant in the middle of the Triassic, as the primary large herbivores in many Carnian-age ecosystems. They sheared plants with premaxillary beaks and plates along the upper jaw with multiple rows of teeth.

One group of archosauromorphs, the archosauriforms, were distinguished by their active predatory lifestyle, with serrated teeth and upright limb postures. Archosauriforms were diverse in the Triassic, including various terrestrial and semiaquatic predators of all shapes and sizes. The large-headed and robust erythrosuchids were among the dominant carnivores in the early Triassic. Phytosaurs were a particularly common group which prospered during the Late Triassic. These long-snouted and semiaquatic predators resemble living crocodiles and probably had a similar lifestyle, hunting for fish and small reptiles around the water's edge. However, this resemblance is only superficial and is a prime-case of convergent evolution.

True archosaurs appeared in the early Triassic, splitting into two branches: Avemetatarsalia (the ancestors to birds) and Pseudosuchia (the ancestors to crocodilians). Avemetatarsalians were a minor component of their ecosystems, but eventually produced the earliest pterosaurs and dinosaurs in the Late Triassic. Early long-tailed pterosaurs appeared in the Norian and quickly spread worldwide. Triassic dinosaurs evolved in the Carnian and include early sauropodomorphs and theropods.

The large predator Smok was most likely also an archosaur, but it is uncertain if it was a primitive dinosaur or a pseudosuchian.

Pseudosuchians were far more ecologically dominant in the Triassic, including large herbivores (such as aetosaurs), large carnivores ("rauisuchians"), and the first crocodylomorphs ("sphenosuchians"). Aetosaurs were heavily-armored reptiles that were common during the last 30 million years of the Late Triassic until they died out at the Triassic-Jurassic extinction. Most aetosaurs were herbivorous and fed on low-growing plants, but some may have eaten meat. "rauisuchians" (formally known as paracrocodylomorphs) were the keystone predators of most Triassic terrestrial ecosystems. Over 25 species have been found, including giant quadrupedal hunters, sleek bipedal omnivores, and lumbering beasts with deep sails on their backs. They probably occupied the large-predator niche later filled by theropods. "Rauisuchians" were ancestral to small, lightly-built crocodylomorphs, the only pseudosuchians which survived into the Jurassic.

Marine reptiles 

There were many types of marine reptiles. These included the Sauropterygia, which featured pachypleurosaurus and nothosaurs (both common during the Middle Triassic, especially in the Tethys region), placodonts, the earliest known herbivorous marine reptile Atopodentatus, and the first plesiosaurs. The first of the lizardlike Thalattosauria (askeptosaurs) and the highly successful ichthyosaurs, which appeared in Early Triassic seas soon diversified, and some eventually developed to huge size during the Late Triassic.

Other reptiles 
Among other reptiles, the earliest turtles, like Proganochelys and Proterochersis, appeared during the Norian Age (Stage) of the Late Triassic Period. The Lepidosauromorpha, specifically the Sphenodontia, are first found in the fossil record of the earlier Carnian Age, though the earliest lepidosauromorphs likely occurred in the Permian. The Procolophonidae, the last surviving parareptiles, were an important group of small lizard-like herbivores. The drepanosaurs were a clade of unusual, chameleon-like arboreal reptiles with birdlike heads and specialised claws.

Synapsids 
Three therapsid groups survived into the Triassic: dicynodonts, therocephalians, and cynodonts. The cynodont Cynognathus was a characteristic top predator in the Olenekian and Anisian of Gondwana. Both kannemeyeriiform dicynodonts and gomphodont cynodonts remained important herbivores during much of the period. Therocephalians included both large predators (Moschorhinus) and herbivorous forms (bauriids) until their extinction midway through the period. Ecteniniid cynodonts played a role as large-sized, cursorial predators in the Late Triassic. During the Carnian (early part of the Late Triassic), some advanced cynodonts gave rise to the first mammals.

During the Triassic, archosaurs displaced therapsids as the largest and most ecologically prolific terrestrial amniotes. This "Triassic Takeover" may have contributed to the evolution of mammals by forcing the surviving therapsids and their mammaliaform successors to live as small, mainly nocturnal insectivores. Nocturnal life may have forced the mammaliaforms to develop fur and a higher metabolic rate.

Lagerstätten
The Monte San Giorgio lagerstätte, now in the Lake Lugano region of northern Italy and Switzerland, was in Triassic times a lagoon behind reefs with an anoxic bottom layer, so there were no scavengers and little turbulence to disturb fossilization, a situation that can be compared to the better-known Jurassic Solnhofen Limestone lagerstätte.

The remains of fish and various marine reptiles (including the common pachypleurosaur Neusticosaurus, and the bizarre long-necked archosauromorph Tanystropheus), along with some terrestrial forms like Ticinosuchus and Macrocnemus, have been recovered from this locality. All these fossils date from the Anisian/Ladinian transition (about 237 million years ago).

Triassic–Jurassic extinction event

The Triassic Period ended with a mass extinction, which was particularly severe in the oceans; the conodonts disappeared, as did all the marine reptiles except ichthyosaurs and plesiosaurs. Invertebrates like brachiopods and molluscs (such as gastropods) were severely affected. In the oceans, 22% of marine families and possibly about half of marine genera went missing.

Though the end-Triassic extinction event was not equally devastating in all terrestrial ecosystems, several important clades of crurotarsans (large archosaurian reptiles previously grouped together as the thecodonts) disappeared, as did most of the large labyrinthodont amphibians, groups of small reptiles, and most synapsids. Some of the early, primitive dinosaurs also became extinct, but more adaptive ones survived to evolve into the Jurassic. Surviving plants that went on to dominate the Mesozoic world included modern conifers and cycadeoids.

The cause of the Late Triassic extinction is uncertain. It was accompanied by huge volcanic eruptions that occurred as the supercontinent Pangaea began to break apart about 202 to 191 million years ago (40Ar/39Ar dates), forming the Central Atlantic Magmatic Province (CAMP), one of the largest known inland volcanic events since the planet had first cooled and stabilized. Other possible but less likely causes for the extinction events include global cooling or even a bolide impact, for which an impact crater containing Manicouagan Reservoir in Quebec, Canada, has been singled out. However, the Manicouagan impact melt has been dated to 214±1 Mya. The date of the Triassic-Jurassic boundary has also been more accurately fixed recently, at  Mya. Both dates are gaining accuracy by using more accurate forms of radiometric dating, in particular the decay of uranium to lead in zircons formed at time of the impact. So, the evidence suggests the Manicouagan impact preceded the end of the Triassic by approximately 10±2 Ma. It could not therefore be the immediate cause of the observed mass extinction.

The number of Late Triassic extinctions is disputed. Some studies suggest that there are at least two periods of extinction towards the end of the Triassic, separated by 12 to 17 million years. But arguing against this is a recent study of North American faunas. In the Petrified Forest of northeast Arizona there is a unique sequence of late Carnian-early Norian terrestrial sediments. An analysis in 2002 found no significant change in the paleoenvironment. Phytosaurs, the most common fossils there, experienced a change-over only at the genus level, and the number of species remained the same. Some aetosaurs, the next most common tetrapods, and early dinosaurs, passed through unchanged. However, both phytosaurs and aetosaurs were among the groups of archosaur reptiles completely wiped out by the end-Triassic extinction event.

It seems likely then that there was some sort of end-Carnian extinction, when several herbivorous archosauromorph groups died out, while the large herbivorous therapsids—the kannemeyeriid dicynodonts and the traversodont cynodonts—were much reduced in the northern half of Pangaea (Laurasia).

These extinctions within the Triassic and at its end allowed the dinosaurs to expand into many niches that had become unoccupied. Dinosaurs became increasingly dominant, abundant and diverse, and remained that way for the next 150 million years. The true "Age of Dinosaurs" is during the following Jurassic and Cretaceous periods, rather than the Triassic.

See also

Geologic time scale
List of fossil sites (with link directory)
 Triassic land vertebrate faunachrons
Phylloceratina
Dinosaurs

Notes

References
Emiliani, Cesare. (1992). Planet Earth: Cosmology, Geology, & the Evolution of Life & the Environment. Cambridge University Press. (Paperback Edition )
Ogg, Jim; June, 2004, Overview of Global Boundary Stratotype Sections and Points (GSSP's) Stratigraphy.org, Accessed April 30, 2006
Stanley, Steven M. Earth System History. New York: W.H. Freeman and Company, 1999. 
Sues, Hans-Dieter & Fraser, Nicholas C. Triassic Life on Land: The Great Transition New York: Columbia University Press, 2010. Series: Critical Moments and Perspectives in Earth History and Paleobiology. 
van Andel, Tjeerd, (1985) 1994, New Views on an Old Planet: A History of Global Change, Cambridge University Press

External links

Overall introduction
'The Triassic world'
Douglas Henderson's illustrations of Triassic animals
Paleofiles page on the Triassic extinctions
Examples of Triassic Fossils
Triassic (chronostratigraphy scale)

 
Geological periods
1834 in paleontology